The Xiali N5 is a subcompact sedan produced by the Chinese automotive manufacturer FAW Group under the Xiali brand.

Overview 
The N5 ranks in the class of supermini and closes the gap between the Xiali N3 and the Xiali Vela. The Japanese sister model of the N5 is marketed in some markets as the seventh generation Daihatsu Charade. The Chinese N5 and the Japanese Charade are only available as notchback versions.

Technical data 
The sedan is powered by a  strong one-liter petrol engine with three cylinders or a  strong 1.3-liter gasoline engine with four cylinders.

References 

FAW Group vehicles
Cars introduced in 2009
Front-wheel-drive vehicles
Subcompact cars
Sedans